Kazarman Airport (Kyrgyz: Казарман аэропорту, Russian: Казарманский аэропорт)  is an airport serving Kazarman, a village in the Toguz-Toro District of Jalal-Abad Region (oblast), Kyrgyzstan. The Russian IATA code for Kazarman Airport is КЗМ.

Kazarman Airport started operations in the 1940s as a landing strip on the outskirts of the gold-mining village. The current runway and terminal were built in 1985. It is a regional class 3C airport. The runway has a weight limit of 22 tonnes, and has no instrument landing facilities and operates only during daylight hours.

Kazarman Airport has no customs and border control checks and serves only flights within Kyrgyzstan. Until 2000, the airport had year-round links with Jalal-Abad, Naryn, Bishkek and Osh. Flights to Jalal-Abad, Osh and Bishkek resumed on April 24, 2013.

Airlines and destinations

Accidents

On June 29, 1983, an Aeroflot Yakovlev YAK-40 (CCCP-87808) crashed after encountering wind shear.

References

External links
  UAFZ pilot info for Kazarman Airport

Airports in Kyrgyzstan
Airports built in the Soviet Union
Jalal-Abad Region